Shays may refer to:

 Daniel Shays (c. 1747 – 1825), post-colonial leader of Shays' Rebellion
 Chris Shays (born 1945), American politician and former United States Congressman from Connecticut
 Rosalind Shays, a fictional attorney in several seasons of L.A. Law, portrayed by Diana Muldaur

See also
Shay (disambiguation)